Soul Talk may refer to:

Soul Talk (Johnny "Hammond" Smith album), 1969
Soul Talk (Leo Wright album), recorded in 1963 and released in 1970